Pertuis is a commune in the Vaucluse department in the Provence-Alpes-Côte d'Azur region in southeastern France.

Located south of the Luberon, this town is also near Aix-en-Provence, a famous town. Pertuis has existed since at least 981, while a castle was first built in the 12th century.

Population

Pertuis has registered significant population growth since the 1960s, with a threefold increase during this period.

International relations

Pertuis is twinned with:
 Alton, Hampshire, England
 Herborn, Hesse, Germany
 Este, Veneto, Italy
 Utiel, Spain

Notable people from Pertuis
 Henry de Saint Didier (16th century), fencer and author of the first French book on fencing (1573)
 Victor de Riqueti, marquis de Mirabeau (1715–1789), economist
 Michèle Torr (1947-), singer
 Cyril Rool (1975-), footballer
 Malick Bowens (1941-2017), actor

Gallery

See also
Communes of the Vaucluse department

References

External links

 Official website
 The portal website

Communes of Vaucluse